The Homestead is a historic cure cottage located at Saranac Lake, Franklin County, New York.  It was built about 1890 and is a small, two-story, wood-frame dwelling with a gambrel roof in the Colonial Revival style.  It features a large octagonal glass-enclosed porch and a verandah.

It was listed on the National Register of Historic Places in 1992.

References

Houses on the National Register of Historic Places in New York (state)
Colonial Revival architecture in New York (state)
Houses completed in 1890
Houses in Franklin County, New York
National Register of Historic Places in Franklin County, New York